"I Can't Stand Myself (When You Touch Me)", also known as "I Can't Stand It", is a song written and recorded by James Brown in 1967. It is the most successful of the handful of recordings he made with The Dapps, a band of white musicians led by Beau Dollar. The single release of the song, on which its transposure was pushed up a half step/key, rose to #4 on the Billboard R&B chart and #28 on the Pop chart. The single's B-side, "There Was a Time", also charted.

"I Can't Stand Myself (When You Touch Me)" was included on the 1968 album I Can't Stand Myself When You Touch Me, where it was labeled "Pt. 1". A "Pt. 2", which appeared later in the album, never received a single release.

Musicians
 James Brown - lead vocal

and the Dapps:
 Tim Hedding - organ
 "Fat Eddie" Setser - guitar
 Tim Drummond - bass
 William "Beau Dollar" Bowman - drums

Chart performance

Other versions
Brown re-recorded "I Can't Stand Myself (When You Touch Me)" 4 times: in 1971 for Hot Pants under the title Can't Stand It, 1974 for album Hell under the title "I Can't Stand It '76'" 1976 for Get Up Offa That Thing under the title This Feeling , and with synthesizers in 1998 for the album I'm Back. A live version of the song is included on the 1998 album Say It Live and Loud: Live in Dallas 08.26.68.

James Chance and the Contortions covered the song on the 1978 No Wave compilation album No New York.

References

James Brown songs
Songs written by James Brown
1967 singles
1967 songs
King Records (United States) singles